Jean Goujon  (21 April 1914 – 28 April 1991) was a French cyclist. He won the gold medal in team pursuit at the 1936 Summer Olympics. In 1937 he turned professional and rode the 1937 Tour de France. He retired in 1949.

References

1914 births
1991 deaths
Cyclists at the 1936 Summer Olympics
Olympic cyclists of France
Olympic gold medalists for France
French male cyclists
Olympic medalists in cycling
Cyclists from Paris
Medalists at the 1936 Summer Olympics
French track cyclists